Hibbertia caudice is a species of flowering plant in the family Dilleniaceae and is endemic to northern Australia. It is a shrub with wiry stems, hairy foliage, elliptic to lance-shaped leaves with the narrower end towards the base, and yellow flowers arranged in leaf axils, mostly with twenty-four to twenty-six stamens arranged in groups around the two carpels.

Description
There are twenty-four to twenty-six stamens arranged in groups around the two carpels, each carpel with two ovules. Flowering mainly occurs from March to November.

Taxonomy
Hibbertia caudice was first formally described in 2010 by Hellmut R. Toelken in the Journal of the Adelaide Botanic Gardens from specimens collected by Glen Wightmann in Nhulunbuy in 1988. The specific epithet (caudice) means "with rootstock".

Distribution and habitat
This hibbertia grows in woodland, often above creek banks and is widespread and common in the north of the Northern Territory, including on Bathurst and Melville Islands, and on Cape York Peninsula in Queensland.

Conservation status
Goodenia caudice is classified as of "least concern" under the Northern Territory Government Territory Parks and Wildlife Conservation Act 1976 and the Queensland Government Nature Conservation Act 1992.

See also
List of Hibbertia species

References

caudice
Flora of the Northern Territory
Flora of Queensland
Plants described in 2010
Taxa named by Hellmut R. Toelken